Ivan Dimić (4 July 1921 – 19 October 2004) was a Serbian basketball player.

Playing career 
Dimić took future FIBA Hall of Famer Nebojša Popović to his first training session in Belgrade. Dimić played for a Belgrade-based team Crvena zvezda of the Yugoslav First League. In the 1946 season, he won the National Championships. In the 1946 Zvezda season, Dimić averaged 0.9 points per game while appearing in all 7 games.

References

1921 births
2004 deaths
Guards (basketball)
KK Crvena zvezda players
Serbian men's basketball players
Sportspeople from Geneva
Yugoslav men's basketball players
1942 Belgrade Basketball Championship players